The Mercer Island School District is a public U.S. school district in Washington. Located in an affluent bedroom community of Seattle, Mercer Island, it has a strong academic reputation. The six schools on Mercer Island provide approximately 4,000 students with primary and secondary education.

Mercer Island High School won the Washington Interscholastic Activities Association (WIAA) and Washington Army National Guard 2015-16 Scholastic Cup Champions for the 3A classification. MIHS has held this title since 2007.

Schools
The school district is made up of four elementary schools, one middle school, and one high school (with an alternative branch).
 Elementary Schools:
 Lakeridge Elementary
 Island Park Elementary
 Northwood Elementary
 West Mercer Elementary

 Middle School:
 Islander Middle School

 High Schools:
 Mercer Island High School

External links
 Mercer Island Schools Foundation home page
 Islander Middle School
 Mercer Island School District

References

School districts in Washington (state)
Education in King County, Washington